Steinach may refer to:

Places and rivers
in Germany:
Steinach, Baden-Württemberg, a municipality in the Ortenaukreis district
Steinach, Bavaria, a municipality in the Straubing-Bogen district
Steinach, Thuringia, a town in the Sonneberg district
Steinach (Rodach), a river of Thuringia and Bavaria, tributary of the Rodach, itself a tributary of the Main
Untere Steinach, a river in Bavaria, tributary of the Schorgast
Warme Steinach a river of Bavaria, tributary of the Red Main
Steinach (Neckarsteinach), a river of Hesse and Baden-Württemberg, a tributary of the Neckar in Neckarsteinach
Steinach (Nürtingen), a river of Baden-Württemberg, a tributary of the Neckar in Nürtingen
in Austria:
Steinach am Brenner, a municipality in Tyrol
in Switzerland:
Steinach, St. Gallen, a municipality in the canton of St. Gallen
Steinach (Lake Constance), a tributary of Lake Constance

People
Eugen Steinach (1861-1944), leading Austrian physiologist and pioneer in endocrinology
Bligger von Steinach, the name of a series of feudal lords of Steinach, today Neckarsteinach in Hesse, Germany

Other
Steinach (b Rothenburg o. d. Tauber) station, a railway station in Bavaria, Germany
SV 08 Steinach, a German association football club that plays in Steinach, Thuringia